A microarray database is a repository containing microarray gene expression data. The key uses of a microarray database are to store the measurement data, manage a searchable index, and make the data available to other applications for analysis and interpretation (either directly, or via user downloads).

Microarray databases can fall into two distinct classes:

 A peer reviewed, public repository that adheres to academic or industry standards and is designed to be used by many analysis applications and groups. A good example of this is the Gene Expression Omnibus (GEO) from NCBI or ArrayExpress from EBI.
 A specialized repository associated primarily with the brand of a particular entity (lab, company, university, consortium, group), an application suite, a topic, or an analysis method, whether it is commercial, non-profit, or academic.  These databases might have one or more of the following characteristics:
 A subscription or license may be needed to gain full access,
 The content may come primarily from a specific group (e.g. SMD, or UPSC-BASE), the Immunological Genome Project 
 There may be constraints on who can use the data or for what purpose data can be used,
 Special permission may be required to submit new data, or there may be no obvious process at all,
 Only certain applications may be equipped to use the data, often also associated with the same entity (for example, caArray at NCI is specialized for the caBIG),
 Further processing or reformatting of the data may be required for standard applications or analysis,
 They claim to address the 'urgent need' to have a standard, centralized repository for microarray data. (See YMD, last updated in 2003, for example),
 There is a claim to an incremental improvement over one of the public repositories,
 A meta-analysis application, which incorporates studies from one or more public databases (e.g. Gemma primarily uses GEO studies; NextBio uses various sources)

Some of the most known public, curated microarray databases are:

See also
Biological database
List of biological databases
DNA microarray
DNA microarray#Data warehousing
Microarray analysis techniques

External links
ArrayExpress: Quick Tour on EBI Train OnLine
Exploring functional genomics data with the ArrayExpress Archive on EBI Train OnLine
Investigating gene expression patterns with the Gene Expression Atlas on EBI Train OnLine
ArrayExpress:Submitting data using MAGE-TAB on EBI Train OnLine
ArrayExplorer - A free tool to compare microarrays side by side.

Microarrays
Genetics databases